Shlomo Hacohen of Greece may refer to two people:

Rabbi Shlomo Hacohen author of responsa, published Salonika-Venice 1586–1730.
Another Shlomo Hacohen, possibly ca. 1800, mekubal and posek, known for his commentary to the kabbalistic works of Isaac Luria. This Shlomo's son, Yehudah HaKohen also published a kabbalistic work Ashmoret HaBoker (1853), and a halakhic work Oholei Yehudah (1843), on the Mishneh Torah of Maimonides.

References

External links 
 יפה שעה - שלמה ב"ר יהודה הכהן, (re)printed 1813, Yofeh Sha'ah to the Idrah Rabbah.
 שו"ת שעות דרבנן -  כהן, שלמה בן יהודה, (re)printed 1843, halakhic responsa of Shlomo HaKohen ben Yehudah.

Kohanim writers of Rabbinic literature
Greek Jews